Jim or Jimmy Crawford may refer to:

Entertainment
 Jimmy Crawford (drummer) (1910–1980), American jazz drummer of the swing era
 Jimmy Crawford (British singer) (born 1937), British pop singer in the 1960s
 Jimmy Crawford (Home and Away), a fictional character on the Australian soap opera Home and Away

Sports
 Jim Crawford (American football) (1935–2018), American football player for the Boston Patriots
 Jim Crawford (baseball) (born 1950), former baseball player
 Jim Crawford (footballer) (born 1973), Irish footballer
 Jim Crawford (racing driver) (1948–2002), Scottish auto racing driver
 Jim Crawford (runner), American track athlete and medalist in athletics at the 1971 Pan American Games
 Jimmy Crawford (racing driver) (1944–2007), NASCAR Cup Series driver

Others
 James W. Crawford Jr. (born 1937), known as Jim, Democratic member of the North Carolina General Assembly
 Jim Crawford (playwright) (1908–1973), Australian playwright and journalist

See also
 James Crawford (disambiguation)